is a Japanese computer scientist specializing in object-oriented programming, distributed computing and information security. Being a graduate of the University of Tokyo, Yonezawa has a Ph.D in computer science from MIT in the Actor group at the MIT AI Lab. He currently teaches at the University of Tokyo. He is the designer of ABCL/R, a reflective subset of the first concurrent object-oriented programming language ABCL/1.

In November 2009, he was awarded with a Medal of Honour with purple ribbon by the Government of Japan. He won the Senior Dahl–Nygaard Prize in 2014.

References 

Aki Yonezawa Specification and Verification Techniques for Parallel Programs Based on Message Passing Semantics MIT EECS Doctoral Dissertation. December 1977.

External links 
Official personal page

1947 births
Living people
Japanese computer scientists
Researchers in distributed computing
Academic staff of the University of Tokyo
University of Tokyo alumni
MIT School of Engineering alumni

Dahl–Nygaard Prize